Arthur Hill-Trevor, 3rd Viscount Dungannon (9 November 1798–11 August 1862), of Whittlebury, Northamptonshire, was an English Conservative Party politician for New Romney and the City of Durham.

Early life 
Hill-Trevor was born in Berkeley Square, London, on 9 November 1798 and was the only surviving son of Arthur Hill-Trevor, second viscount (1763–1837), by Charlotte, third daughter of Charles FitzRoy, first Baron Southampton. His younger brother, Charles Henry, died on 18 September 1823 after falling during the Stapleton Park races. Hill-Trevor attended Harrow School and matriculated at Christ Church, Oxford on 17 October 1817. He received his B.A. in 1820 and his M.A. in 1825.

He succeeded his father as the third viscount Dungannon in 1837.

Career 
He became a Member of Parliament (MP) for the constituency of New Romney in 1830, a position that he held until 11 March 1831. He was then elected MP of the City of Durham in between 1831 and 1832, 1835 and 1841, and 5 April 1843 and 14 July 1843. He was an opponent of the reform bills of 1831–2, which would become the Reform Act 1832, and wrote a pamphlet in opposition titled Letter to the Duke of Rutland.

In September 1855, he was elected a representative peer for Ireland and was actively involved in the House of Lords. He led the opposition to the Divorce Bill 1857 and Lord Wodehouse's Marriage Law Amendment (Deceased Wife's Sister) Bill 1859.

Personal life 
On 10 September 1821, he married Sophia, daughter of Colonel Gorges Marcus Irvine of Castle Irvine, Fermanagh. Hill-Trevor died at his home in London, on 11 August 1862. As he had no male children, the peerage became extinct after his death. Edwin Hill-Trevor inherited his estate.

Hill-Trevor, along with publishing several pamphlets, wrote The Life and Times of William III.

References

External links 
 

1798 births
1862 deaths
People from West Northamptonshire District
Conservative Party (UK) MPs for English constituencies
UK MPs 1830–1831
UK MPs 1831–1832
UK MPs 1835–1837
UK MPs 1837–1841
UK MPs 1841–1847
UK MPs who inherited peerages
Viscounts in the Peerage of Ireland
Members of the Parliament of the United Kingdom for City of Durham

Alumni of Christ Church, Oxford
People educated at Harrow School